Bernhard Mettenleiter (25 April 1822, Wallerstein – 14 January 1901, Marktheidenfeld) was a German composer and organist. He was known as the choir director in Günzburg, Memmingen, and Sankt Lorenz. He was the cousin of the composer, Johann Georg Mettenleiter.

Compositions
 Four preludes in 175 Neue Orgelstücke, Op.70 by Johann Diebold (1842 – 1929)

Notes

Further reading

References

External links
 

1822 births
1901 deaths
German composers
German organists